General elections were held in Mexico on 5 July 1964. The presidential elections were won by Gustavo Díaz Ordaz, who received 90.4% of the vote. In the Chamber of Deputies election, the Institutional Revolutionary Party won 175 of the 210 seats.

Results

President

By State

Senate

Chamber of Deputies

References

Mexico
General
Legislative elections in Mexico
Presidential elections in Mexico
July 1964 events in Mexico
Election and referendum articles with incomplete results